The 6th Spring Trophy, was a non-championship race for Formula Two cars. It was held on the Oulton Park circuit, located near Tarporley, Cheshire, England, on 3 April 1965.

Report

Entry
A total of 32 F2 cars were entered for the event. However, only 21 took part in qualifying.

Qualifying

Race
The race was held over 40 laps of the Oulton Park circuit. Denny Hulme took the winner's spoils for the works Brabham team, driving their Brabham-Cosworth BT16. Approximately 19 seconds behind was the second place car of Jackie Stewart, for the Tyrrell Racing Organisation in their BRM-powered Cooper T75. The podium was completed by Alan Rees, in a Brabham-Cosworth BT16 of Roy Winkelmann Racing, a further 23.8 seconds behind Stewart.

Classification

Race Result

 Fastest lap: Graham Hill & Jochen Rindt, 1:41.4secs. (98.015 mph)

References

1965 in motorsport
Auto races in the United Kingdom
Spring